The house at 526 Prospect Street in Methuen, Massachusetts is a well preserved Greek Revival house built about 1840.  It is located near the city's historic early center, and was probably first occupied by farmers. The property was listed on the National Register of Historic Places in 1984.

Description and history
526 Prospect Street is located in a suburban residential area of eastern Methuen, at the southwest corner of Prospect Street and Florence Road.  Prospect Street is a historically old road, found on early town maps as a through road.  The house is a -story wood-frame building with a gabled roof, center chimney, clapboard siding and a granite foundation.  The main five-bay facade is oriented facing south, with a secondary facade facing east toward the road.  The building corners are pilastered, rising to an encircling entablature, and (on the eastern gable end) a fully pedimented gable.  Doorways on both facades feature entablatures and transom windows above; the side entrance also has sidelights.

The house was built about 1840, in an area that saw development early in the city's history, because of its location on a main road leading to the former town center.  This house is one of the city's finer examples of Greek Revival architecture.  Its first occupants were probably farmers, whose products would have been delivered to more densely built areas of Methuen and Lawrence.

See also
 National Register of Historic Places listings in Methuen, Massachusetts
 National Register of Historic Places listings in Essex County, Massachusetts

References

Houses in Methuen, Massachusetts
National Register of Historic Places in Methuen, Massachusetts
Houses on the National Register of Historic Places in Essex County, Massachusetts